Babušnica is a town and municipality located in the Pirot District of south|eastern Serbia. According to 2011 census, the population of the town is 4,601, while population of the municipality is 12,307.

Geography
The municipality borders Gadžin Han municipality in the north-west, Bela Palanka municipality in the north, Pirot and Dimitrovgrad municipalities in the east, Bulgaria in the south, and Crna Trava and Vlasotince municipalities in the west.

History
From 1929 to 1941, Babušnica was part of the Morava Banovina of the Kingdom of Yugoslavia.

Settlements
Aside from the town of Babušnica, the municipality has the following villages:

Demographics

According to the last official census done in 2011, the municipality of Babušnica has 12,307 inhabitants.

Ethnic groups
Ethnic composition of the municipality of Babušnica:

Economy
The following table gives a preview of total number of registered people employed in legal entities per their core activity (as of 2018):

Gallery

See also
 Subdivisions of Serbia

References

External links

 

Populated places in Pirot District
Municipalities and cities of Southern and Eastern Serbia